Sundar (Devanagari: सुन्दर) is an adjective signifying attractive, beautiful, good, handsome or nice. It has its origin in Sanskrit language. The word is also used as names of people by speakers of languages branching off of Indo-Aryan languages.

Given names
Delhi P. Sunder Rajan, Indian violinist
Sundar C., a South Indian film director and actor
Sunder (actor), an actor of Punjabi and Hindi films
Sunder Lal Hora (1896–1955), Indian ichthyologist
Sunder Lal Patwa (1924–2016), Indian politician
Sunder Nix (born 1961), American sprinter
Sundar Pichai (born 1972), CEO of Google LLC and Alphabet Inc.
Sundar Popo (1943–2000), a chutney artist from Trinidad and Tobago
Sundar Raj Indian actor
Sunder Ramu, an Indian film and stage artist
Sunder Singh Bhandari (1921–2005), Indian politician

Middle names
Braja Sundar Mitra
Ramendra Sundar Tribedi
Sadhu Sundar Singh
Shyam Sundar Chakravarthy

References

Hindu given names
Indian masculine given names